Ricardo Arreola Lee (born as March 19, 1948) is a Filipino screenwriter, journalist, novelist, and playwright. He was conferred the Order of National Artists of the Philippines for Film and Broadcast Arts in 2022.

Starting in 1973, he has written more than 180 film screenplays. Aside from the Order of National Artists, which is the Philippines' highest recognition for individuals who have contributed significantly to the classical arts, his work has earned him more than 70 trophies from various award-giving bodies. This includes three life achievement awards from the Cinemanila International Film Festival, the Gawad Urian, and the PMPC. He was also the recipient of the 2015 UP Gawad Plaridel and one of the Gawad CCP awardees for 2015. In 2018 he was a Gawad Dangal ni Balagtas awardee, an Apolinario Mabini Achievement Award recipient, a recipient of a Special Citation for ABS-CBN's Walk-On-Water Awards, and was one of the recipients of the CAMERA OBSCURA awards from the Film Development Council of the Philippines.

As a screenwriter, he has worked with many of the Philippines' most notable film directors, including Lino Brocka, Marilou Diaz-Abaya and Ishmael Bernal. Many of his films have been screened in the international film festival circuit, including Cannes, Toronto, and Berlin, among others.

Early life
Lee grew up with his relatives in Daet, Camarines Norte. His mother died when he was 5 years old and only saw his father on few occasions. He studied primary and secondary school in the same town. It was said that Lee often sneaks into film houses and buries himself in books at the school library, tearing away pages with striking images. An intelligent student, he consistently topped his class from grade school to high school. His promising writing career took a first step when he won his first national literary award for a short story he wrote when he was still in high school. Driven by his passion to pursue dreams, he ran away from home and took a bus to Manila. He roamed the streets, taking on menial tasks as a waiter during the day and asking his town mates to accommodate him during the night until he collapsed one day in Avenida out of hunger.

University years, activism, and early career
He was accepted at University of the Philippines Diliman as an AB English major but never got his diploma. Ironically enough, he later taught screenwriting at its College of Mass Communication.

He started writing fiction in the late 60s, gaining confidence with the publication of his first short story "Mayon" in the Philippine Free Press while he was still in high school. His early efforts won him several national awards in the Pilipino Free Press (Pagtatapos, Third Place-1969) and first prizes in consecutive years for the short story in the Don Carlos Palanca Memorial Awards for Literature (Huwag, Huwag Mong Kukuwentuhan ang Batang si Weng Fung/1969 and Servando Magdamag/ 1970).

A rare achievement for a writer, two of his short stories won first prizes at the Don Carlos Palanca Memorial Awards for Literature for two years in a row (1970 and 1971).

He became an activist during those politically turbulent times and was affiliated with Panulat para sa Kaunlaran ng Sambayanan (PAKSA, or Pen for People's Progress) along with Bienvenido Lumbera and Jose F. Lacaba.

Imprisonment during Martial Law
Since Ferdinand Marcos was arresting numerous academics and writers when he placed the Philippines under Martial Law in 1972, Lee and Lumbera made themselves scarce, and were not caught in the initial wave of arrests.  They were both caught by Marcos' forces in 1974, however. 

Lumbera had gone to Lee's house in España Boulevard to warn him about a recent wave of arrests, only to find that the soldiers were already there arresting Lee. Lumbera ran away and got as far as the corner of Banawe street, but the soldiers eventually caught up with him. 

Lee later described the circumstances of his arrest, saying in Tagalog:
"They asked, ‘Where’s your gun?’ I said, ‘I don’t know how to hold a gun, why would I have a gun? They would find reason even if it was not legitimate because when they captured you, they would call you detainees, not prisoners. There were no charges. You don’t know why. They would just detain you so you can’t move, you can’t be an activist. They’d detain you without any hearing, no charges, and you have no idea when you’d ever get out because you’re a detainee.

Lee and Lumbera shared a cell Ipil Detention Center in Fort Bonifacio. In the recollections of many fellow Ipil detainees, Lee is noted for having became very ill with Rheumatic Fever, and Lumbera is remembered as having taken a great effort to take care of Lee.

Lee and Lumbera  were eventually released a year after they were caught.

Lee and Lumbera eventually returned to the site of Ipil Detention Center after Fort Bonifacio was privatized, and were amused to discover the area in which Ipil was located became the area near SNR and Home Depot, near 32nd Street and 8th Avenue in Bonifacio Global City.

Release and post-detention work
Lee was released in 1975, and his friends Ninotchka Rosca and Rolando Tinio helped him reintegrate into life after detention, and find work.

He was a staff writer of the Pilipino Free Press in the 1970s. Throughout that turbulent decade until the 90s, he wrote features and interviews for the Asia-Philippines Leader, Metro Magazine, Expressweek, TV Times, Malaya Midday, The National Midweek, Veritas and Sunday Inquirer Magazine on topics as diverse as street children, vendors around Quiapo Church, an NPA commander, unsung workers in the film industry, a defunct Gala vaudeville-and-burlesque theater, film actors, an activist-martyr during a tragic peasant protest march, teenage prostitutes, Director Lino Brocka, among others.

1980s and 1990s

Himala
Ricky Lee started writing Himala soon after he was released. He cites his prison experiences as the reason for the film's themes, recounting in a Rappler interview:"I was in prison for one year, so what I wrote in 1976 imbued my experience of being an activist, of being imprisoned for a year at Fort Bonifacio, the questioning, the struggling against this and that belief and so on and so forth" (Translated in reference)

Lee spent six years looking for a producer who would find the film, with no success. Eventually the screenplay won a contest launched by Experimental Cinema of the Philippines, which meant that Lee would ironically be working with Imee Marcos. Despite the irony, Lee kept his peace so that the film would be produced. It was eventually released during the 1982 Metro Manila Film Festival.

The movie was highly successful during its run, receiving nine awards at the Festival and then becaming the first Philippine film to be included in the "Competition Section" of the 33rd Berlin International Film Festival in March 1983.

Brutal, Moral, and Karnal
At the turn of the decade, Ricky Lee was introduced to director Marilou Diaz-Abaya as the screenwriter for Brutal (1980) which came out in the 1980 Metro Manila Film Festival and became very successful. This became the first of a widely acclaimed feminist trilogy of films which included Moral (1982) and Karnal (1983), featuring Diaz-Abaya as director and Lee as screenwriter. Lee's screenplay "Salome/Brutal" won the 1981 Philippine National Book Awards for best screenplay. This began a series of frequent collaborations between Diaz Abaya and Lee which lasted until Diaz Abaya's death in 2012, and saw both Diaz-Abaya and Lee inducted to the Order of National Artists of the Philippines in 2022.

Other 1980s and 1990s works
Lee wrote extensively in the next two and a half decades, with the most critically acclaimed works including 1988's Sandakot Na Bala, co-written and directed by Jose Carreon; 1990's Dyesebel, 1991's Juan Tamad at Mister Shooli: Mongolian Barbecue; 1994's Mayor Cesar Climaco; 1995's The Flor Contemplacion Story; the 1995 Psychological horror story Patayin sa Sindak si Barbara; the 1996 Sharon Cuneta starrer Madrasta; and 1998's Labs Kita... Okey Ka Lang?.

Later career
The late 1990s and early 2000s marked a period which saw Ricky Lee pen screenplays highly acclaimed films, most notably the 1998 bio-epic José Rizal which he co-wrote with Jun Lana and Peter Ong Lim; 1999's Muro-Ami, 1999's Bulaklak ng Maynila, 2000 films Anak, Lagarista, and Deathrow, 2001's Mila, Tatarin, and Bagong Buwan; and 2004's Aishite Imasu 1941: Mahal Kita.

In 2000, he was one of the recipients of the Centennial Honors for the Arts from the Cultural Center of the Philippines and the Gawad Pambansang Alagad ni Balagtas for Tagalog fiction from the Unyon ng mga Manunulat sa Pilipinas.

In 2011, he was awarded the Manila Critics Circle Special Prize for a Book Published by an Independent Publisher. His two-stage plays Pitik-Bulag sa Buwan ng Pebrero and DH (Domestic Helper) played to SRO crowds. DH, starring Nora Aunor, had toured the US and Europe in 1993.

Body of work
His body of work, which has spanned over forty years, include writing short stories, plays, essays, novels, teleplays, and screenplays. He has written more than 150 produced scripts, earning for him more than fifty trophies from all the award-giving bodies in the Philippine movie industry. He has never and will never write any literary work in English, a conviction he holds to this day.

Books
Among the books he has published are: Si Tatang at mga Himala ng Ating Panahon (an anthology of his fiction, reportage, behind-the-scene musings and the full screenplay of Himala), Pitik-Bulag Sa Buwan Ng Pebrero, Brutal/Salome (the first book of screenplays in the Philippines), Moral, Para Kay B and Bukas May Pangarap. His screenplay for Salome has been translated into English and published by the University of Wisconsin–Madison in the U.S. as a part of its textbook in film studies.

Ricky Lee has likewise published a screenplay manual, Trip to Quiapo, which is a required text in many college communications courses.

Novels
In November 2008, he launched his first novel entitled Para kay B (o kung paano dinevastate ng pag-ibig ang 4 out of 5 sa atin) at the University of the Philippines-Diliman Bahay ng Alumni. This was followed exactly three years later by Si Amapola sa 65 na Kabanata, which was launched at the SM North EDSA Skydome and was met similar public acclaim and support.

Mentor
Since 1982, Lee has been conducting scriptwriting workshops for free at his home. He challenges his students to go to the edge, to explore the limits of their imaginations until they feel like drowning. In one of his workshops in Tagaytay, the participants were stuck in a concept that didn't seem to work. He refused to let the group eat until the concept was finished. Hunger, he says, does wonders to one's creativity: it makes you imagine things. To help them come up with three-dimensional characters he encourages his students to inhabit their characters by immersing themselves in the characters' world, either as observers, participants or by acting out the roles of these characters in their own milieu. Thus, the more intrepid students may opt to act as a beggar in Quiapo, or a bargirl in Ermita, or a squatter in Smokey Mountain, even for one day, with hilarious results. One leaves the exercise a bit shaken but full of life-sustaining insights.

Ricardo Lee Film Festival
On January 22, 2008, filmmaker Nick Deocampo, Director of the Mowelfund Film Institute (1989–2008) and Center for New Cinema (2008–present) announced the holding of a Ricardo Lee Film Festival from February 4 to 10, 2008 - the World Arts Festival under Mayor Tito Sarion, in Daet, Camarines Norte. Lee’s scripts became Philippine cinema classics of Philippine cinema, which made the 2nd golden age of 1980 Filipino movies. Five films were shown in the festival: Gina Alajar's Salome, Anak, Muro Ami, Gumapang Ka sa Lusak, and Memories of Old Manila.

Current affiliation
Ricky Lee formerly works as a Creative Manager at the ABS-CBN Broadcasting Corporation. However, after the denial of the network's franchise by the House of Representatives, he moved to GMA Network.

He also established and heads the Trip to Quiapo Foundation former Philippine Writers Studio, which aims to provide support to new and struggling writers. In the works is the resumption of his free TV and film scriptwriting workshop in 2012.

Filmography

Screenplays

Dragnet (co-writer, uncredited; 1973)
Itim (co-writer, uncredited; 1976)
Pabonggahan (documentary; 1979)
Jaguar (1979)
Miss X (1980)
Brutal (1980)
Playgirl (1981)
Carnival Queen (1981)
Salome (1981)
Karma (1981)
PX (1982)
Ito Ba ang Ating Mga Anak? (1982)
Relasyon (1982)
Cain and Abel (1982)
Moral (1982)
Himala (1982)
Haplos (1982)
Gabi Kung Sumikat ang Araw (1983)
Karnal (1983)
Sinner or Saint (1984)
Baby Tsina (1984)
Bukas... May Pangarap (1984)
Silip: Daughters of Eve (1985)
White Slavery (1985)
Private Show (1985)
Bomba Arienda (1985)
Flesh Avenue (1986)
Nasaan Ka Nang Kailangan Kita? (1986)
Paano Kung Wala Ka Na? (1987)
Olongapo... The Great American Dream (1987)
The Untold Story of Melanie Marquez (1987)
Kumander Dante (1988)
Birds of Prey (1988)
Sandakot Na Bala (with Jose Carreon, 1988)
Babaing Hampaslupa (1988)
Macho Dancer (1989)
Hot Summer (1989)
Sa Kuko ng Agila (1989)
Virginia P. (1989)
Ang Bukas Ay Akin Langit ang Uusig (1989)
Dyesebel (1990)
Nagsimula sa Puso (1990)
Gumapang Ka sa Lusak (1990)
Mundo Man ay Magunaw (1990)
Beautiful Girl (1990)
Hindi Laruan ang Puso (1990)
Hahamakin Lahat (1990)
Andrea, Paano Ba ang Maging Isang Ina? (1990)
Pakasalan Mo Ako (1991)
I Want to Live (1991)
Class of '91 (1991)
Hinukay Ko Na ang Libingan Mo! (1991)
Juan Tamad at Mister Shooli: Mongolian Barbecue (1991)
Ang Totoong Buhay ni Pacita M. (1991)
Secrets of Pura (1991)
Sa Aking Puso: The Marcos 'Bong' Manalang Story (1992)
Kamay ni Cain (1992)
Apoy sa Puso (1992)
Ako ang Katarungan (Lt. Napoleon M. Guevarra) (1992)
Narito ang Puso Ko (1992)
Ayoko na Sanang Magmahal (1993)
Because I Love You (1993)
Inay (1993)
Kung Kailangan mo Ako (1993)
Pangako ng Kahapon (1994)
Mayor Cesar Climaco (1994)
Bawal na Gamot (1994)
Loretta (1994)
Midnight Dancers (1994)
Separada (1994)
Saan Ako Nagkamali? (1995)
Minsan May Pangarap: The Guce Family Story (1995)
Bawal na Gamot 2 (1995)
The Flor Contemplacion Story (1995)
Redeem Her Honor (1995)
Mangarap Ka (1995)
Muling Umawit ang Puso (1995)
Patayin sa Sindak si Barbara (1995)
Asero (1995)
May Nagmamahal Sa'yo (1996)
Sa Aking mga Kamay (1996)
Utol (1996)
Madrasta (1996)
Lahar (1996)
Hangga't May Hininga (1996)
Nights of Serafina (1996)
Kadre (1997)
Sanggano (1997)
Wala Ka Nang Puwang sa Mundo (1997)
Ipaglaban Mo II: The Movie (1997)
Hanggang Kailan Kita Mamahalin? (1997)
Calvento Files: The Movie (1997)
Mapusok (1998)
Pusong Mamon (1998)
Curacha: Ang Babaeng Walang Pahinga (1998)
Miguel/Michelle (1998)
Labs Kita... Okey Ka Lang? (1998)
Magandang Hatinggabi (1998)
José Rizal (1998)
Sidhi (1999)
Burlesk King (1999)
'Di Puwedeng Hindi Puwede! (1999)
Hey Babe! (1999)
Muro-Ami (1999)
Bulaklak ng Maynila (1999)
Minsan, Minahal Kita (2000)
Anak (2000)
Lagarista (2000)
Deathrow (2000)
ID (2001)
Hostage (2001)
Ooops, Teka Lang... Diskarte ko 'to! (2001)
Luv Text (2001)
Mila (2001)
Huwag Kang Kikibo... (2001)
Angels (2001)
Tatarin (2001)
Bagong Buwan (2001)
May Pag-ibig Pa Kaya? (2002)
Kung Ikaw Ay Isang Panaginip (2002)
Then and Now (2003)
I Will Survive (2004)
Sabel (2004)
Liberated 2 (2004)
So... Happy Together (2004)
Aishite Imasu 1941: Mahal Kita (2004)
Dubai (2005)
Twilight Dancers (2006)
Wag Kang Lilingon (2006)
Fuchsia (2009)
Kamoteng Kahoy (2009)
Bente (2009)
Mamarazzi (2010)
Sa 'yo Lamang (2010)
Shake, Rattle and Roll Fourteen: The Invasion (Segment: "Panama"; 2012)
Burgos (2013)
Lauriana (2013)
Lihis (2013)
Justice (2014)
The Trial (2014)
Ringgo: The Dog Shooter (2016)
Iadya mo Kami (2016)
Bes and the Beshies (2017)
Culion (2019)
Hindi Tayo Pwede (2020)
Servando Magdamag (2020)

See also
 Bienvenido Lumbera
 Ninotchka Rosca

References

External links
RICARDO LEE: A Writer in the Film Industry by National Artist for Literature Dr. Bien Lumbera 
A ‘manananggal’ is the heroine of Ricky Lee’s new novel
Ricky Lee launches second novel, Si Amapola sa 65 na Kabanata

1948 births
Living people
Bicolano people
Bikolano writers
Filipino people of Chinese descent
Filipino writers
Marcos martial law prisoners jailed at Ipil Detention Center
Marcos martial law victims
People from Camarines Norte
Tagalog-language writers
University of the Philippines Diliman alumni
ABS-CBN people
GMA Network (company) people